2009 Fagiano Okayama season

Competitions

League table

Player statistics

Other pages 
 J. League official site

Fagiano Okayama
Fagiano Okayama seasons